Giannitsou is a semi-mountainous village, altitude of ~300m above the sea level, in western Phthiotis/Central Greece, with fewer than 300 inhabitants. It is located northern of Makrakomi and 36 km northwestern of Lamia. After the recent reorganization of administrative divisions (Kallikratis Plan) it is part of the municipality of Makrakomi. In walking distance from the village there is a pre-Ottoman-era settlement which is yet unexplored, called Lavanitsa.

The local economy is based on agriculture, i.e. olives, wheat, grapes, wine, and livestock. Lately, after the renovation of Platystomo hot-springs, which are only 4 km away, the area got a touristic perspective.

Although the village is not fully developed, the central square is framed by two traditional cafes and a grocery shop. In addition, in the village an active cultural institution  is based which organises several happenings around the year.

References

Populated places in Phthiotis
Villages in Greece